Old Greenwich station is a commuter rail station served by the Metro-North Railroad New Haven Line, located in the Old Greenwich neighborhood of Greenwich, Connecticut. The station has two side platforms, each ten cars long, which serve the outer tracks of the four-track Northeast Corridor.

History

The station was built in 1872 as Sound Beach, named after nearby Greenwich Point Beach. It was renamed Old Greenwich in 1931. The current station building, built about 1894, is a well-preserved example of the New Haven Railroad's period stations, with a utilitarian interior and exterior nods to period Victorian architectural styles.  It was added to the National Register of Historic Places in 1989 as Sound Beach Railroad Station.  The station formerly had six-car-length high-level platforms, which could not serve all cars on some trains. In 2009, Metro-North began planning a project to replace structurally deficient railroad bridges over South Beach Avenue and Tomac Avenue. The scope of the project was later expanded to include platform extensions to 10-car length, as well as an expansion of the south parking lot. Notice to proceed on the $14.9 million project was given in August 2014, and construction began the next May. After several delays, the project was completed in late 2019. A retaining wall built for the parking lot expansion attracted criticism for its stark design, with comparisons to the Berlin Wall and The Wall from Game of Thrones.

References

External links

 Sound Beach Avenue entrance from Google Maps Street View

Metro-North Railroad stations in Connecticut
Stations on the Northeast Corridor
Stations along New York, New Haven and Hartford Railroad lines
Railroad stations in Fairfield County, Connecticut
Railway stations on the National Register of Historic Places in Connecticut
Buildings and structures in Greenwich, Connecticut
Railway stations in the United States opened in 1892
National Register of Historic Places in Fairfield County, Connecticut
1892 establishments in Connecticut